Thoracocharax stellatus, the silver hatchetfish, spotfin silver hatchetfish, spotted hatchetfish or platinum hatchetfish, is a widespread hatchetfish found throughout South America including Venezuela, Colombia, Ecuador, Brazil, Peru, Bolivia, Paraguay, and Argentina in the Amazon, Orinoco, Paraguay and Tocantins-Araguaia basins. This species is one of the largest of the hatchetfishes. It is usually found in areas with abundant riparian vegetation.

Description 
A typical hatchetfish, Thoracocharax stellatus is superficially similar to Thoracocharax securis, but has a prominent dark spot in the dorsal-fin. In the wild, adults vary in length between 21–55mm, but in captivity, can grow up to between 60–70mm,maximum length is 80mm.

Taxonomy 
The genus Thoracocharax is monophyletic and is sister to Carnegiella and Gasteropelecus. Thoracocharax stellatus has four distinct lineages suggesting the this species may represents a species complex. The four lineages are found in the following rivers:

 Orinoco River (most basal): Venezuela and Colombia
 Paraguay River: Paraguay
 Araguaia River: Brazil
 Amazonas River: Brazil
The genus name, Thoracocharax, is derived from the Greek θώραξ (thṓraks), meaning breastplate or cuirass coupled with the word Charax, type genus of the Order Characiformes, which comes from the Ancient Greek χάραξ (chárax), meaning a palisade of pointed sticks, in reference to the densely packed sharp teeth of the fish. The species epithet, stellatus, is Latin for starry or studded with stars, a reference to the fish's platinum-coloured shiny appearance.

Diet 
In the wild, feeding occurs at sunrise and sunset, and analysis of the stomach contents of 88 specimens indicates that this species is mostly insectivorous (99.6% of stomach contents were insects) and consisted mostly of ants, beetles, and mayflies. Thoracocharax stellatus appears to be a specialist on terrestrial insects and feeds by leaping out of the water and taking insects from riparian vegetation.

Aquarium care 
Because of this fish's propensity to jump several meters out of water for feeding, a cover or lid may be necessary or floating plants over the water's surface. An Amazon biotope-style tank is preferred (e.g. driftwood branches, sand substrate, leaf litter). Breeding is difficult, but possible in single-species tanks.

References 

.

Thoracocharax
Fish of South America
Taxa named by Rudolf Kner
Fish described in 1858